Zauclophora is a genus of moths of the family Xyloryctidae described by Turner in 1900.

Species
 Zauclophora muscerdella (Zeller, 1873)
 Zauclophora pelodes Turner, 1900
 Zauclophora procellosa (Lucas, 1901)

Former species
 Zauclophora albulella (Walker, 1864)
 Zauclophora metaphaeella (Walker, 1863)

References

 
Xyloryctidae
Xyloryctidae genera